Aechmea fulgens, the coralberry, is a bromeliad, which is often used like an ornamental plant. This plant grows in Brazil, especially in following states: Bahia and Pernambuco.

Cultivars
 Aechmea 'Burning Bush'
 Aechmea 'Festival'
 Aechmea 'Fulgida'
 Aechmea 'Ice-T'
 Aechmea 'Jeanne Eunice'
 Aechmea 'Torch'

References

BSI Cultivar Registry Retrieved 11 October 2009

External links
 Aechmea fulgens 
  Aechmea fulgens

fulgens
Flora of Brazil
Plants described in 1841
Taxa named by Adolphe-Théodore Brongniart